William Thompson may refer to:

Academics
 William Forde Thompson, 21st century psychologist
 William Hepworth Thompson (1810–1886), English classical scholar
 William Gilman Thompson (1856–1927), American professor of medicine
 William Oxley Thompson (1855–1933), president of Ohio State University
 William Hertzog Thompson (1895–1981), American psychology professor and minister
 William Irwin Thompson (1938–2020), American social philosopher and cultural critic
 William Robert Thompson (1923/4–1979), Canadian psychologist and behavior geneticist

Entertainment
 William Thompson (poet) (1712–1766), English poet
 William C. Thompson (cinematographer) (1899–1963), American cinematographer
 William H. Thompson (actor), (1852-1923), American actor
 William Tappan Thompson (1812–1882), American humorist and journalist
 Will Lamartine Thompson (1847–1909), American composer

Military
 William Thompson (Leveller) (died 1649), Leveller leader of the Banbury mutiny of the New Model Army in 1649
 William Thompson (general) (1736–1781), American Revolutionary War general
 William Thompson (Medal of Honor, 1861) (1812–1872), signal quartermaster in the American Civil War
 William P. Thompson (1844–1864), American Civil War recipient of the Medal of Honor
 William Francis Kynaston Thompson (1909–1980), British officer who fought and was captured at Arnhem
 William Thompson (admiral) (1922–2018), American admiral, former chief of the U.S. Navy Memorial Foundation
 William Thompson (Medal of Honor, 1950) (1927–1950), Korean War recipient of the Medal of Honor
 Frank Thompson (SOE officer) (William Frank Thompson, 1920–1944), British officer who worked in Bulgaria in the Second World War
 James Thompson (VC) (William James Thompson, 1830–1891), English recipient of the Victoria Cross

Politics

U.S.
 William Thompson (North Carolina politician) (1772–1802), member of the North Carolina General Assembly
 William B. Thompson (1797–?), Virginia farmer and politician
 William Thompson (Iowa politician) (1813–1897), representative from Iowa
 William C. Thompson (New York), lawyer and state senator
 William F. Thompson (1852–?), representative from Florida
 William George Thompson (1830–1911), representative from Iowa
 William G. Thompson (1840–1904), mayor of Detroit
 William Henry Thompson (1853–1937), senator from Nebraska
 William I. S. Thompson (1936-1993), member of the Mississippi House of Representatives 
 William Barlum Thompson (1860–1941), mayor of Detroit
 William T. Thompson (Nebraska politician) (1860–1939), Nebraska Attorney General and Solicitor of the United States Treasury
 William Hale Thompson (1868–1944), mayor of Chicago
 William Howard Thompson (1871–1928), senator from Kansas
 W. Lair Thompson (1880–1940), American politician and lawyer from the state of Oregon
 William Carrington Thompson (1915–2011), American politician and jurist from Virginia
 William Thompson (New York) (born 1953), New York City Comptroller and Democratic nominee for mayor of New York City

U.K.
 William Thompson (died 1637), MP for Scarborough
 William Thompson (1614–1681), English Member of Parliament for the City of London
 William Thompson (1629–1692), English Member of Parliament for Scarborough
 William Thompson (Ipswich MP) (1678–1739), English Member of Parliament for Ipswich
 William Thompson (died 1744) (c.1680–1744), British Whig politician, MP for Scarborough 1701–1722 and 1730–1744
 William Thompson (1792–1854), MP for Callington, London, Sunderland and Westmorland, also Sheriff and Lord Mayor of London
 William Thompson (Ulster Unionist politician) (1939–2010), Northern Ireland politician

Elsewhere
 William Thompson (Upper Canada) (1786–1860)
 William Thompson (New South Wales politician) (1862–1937), Australian politician
 William Thompson (Australian politician) (1863–1953)
 William Murray Thompson (1841–1912), railway contractor and politician in Brisbane, Queensland, Australia

Science
 William Thompson (naturalist) (1805–1852), Irish ornithologist and botanist
 William Thompson (viticulturist) (1816–1897), Englishman who developed the Thompson Seedless grape
 William Wardlaw Thompson (died 1917), South African ichthyologist and zoologist
 William Thompson (physician) (1861–1926), physician, Registrar General for Ireland
 William A. Thompson (1864–1925), member of the U.S Army Corps of Engineers
 William Boyce Thompson (1869–1930), American mining engineer and financier
 William R. Thompson (1887–1972), Canadian entomologist
 William Francis Thompson (1888–1965), American ichthyologist
 William Lay Thompson (1930–2016), American ornithologist

Sports
 William Thompson (boxer) (1811–1880), British prizefighter
 William Thompson (archer) (1848–1918), American archer
 William V. Thompson (1865–1938), American bowler
 William Thompson (cricketer, born 1866) (1866–1920), English first-class cricketer
 Willie Thompson (William Pringle Thompson, 1867–1928), English footballer, played for Newcastle United in the 1890s 
 William Thompson (cricketer, born 1882) (1882–1954), English cricketer
 William Thompson (Australian cricketer) (born 1891), Australian cricketer
 William Thompson (British Guiana cricketer) (born 1888), Guyanese cricketer
 William Thompson (rower) (1908–1956), American Olympic rower
 William Thompson (footballer), Scottish footballer
 William Thompson (skier) (1905-1994), Canadian Olympic skier
 Will Thompson (baseball) (1870–1962), American baseball player

Other
 William Thompson (banker), Governor of the Bank of England from 1725 to 1727
 William Thompson (Methodist) (1733–1799), first President of the Methodist Conference after Wesley's death
 William Thompson (philosopher) (1775–1833), Irish political and philosophical writer and social reformer
 William Thompson (journalist) (1846–1934), American Indian fighter and newspaper editor
 William Clyde Thompson (1839–1912), leader of the Mount Tabor Indian Community in Texas
 William Thompson (bishop) (1885–1975), Anglican bishop of Persia (Iran)
 William A. Thompson (bishop) (1946-2020), Anglican bishop of the Diocese of Western Anglicans (U.S.)
 William Thompson (archdeacon of Cork) (1766–1833)
 William Thompson (archdeacon of Wellington), Canadian Anglican priest 
 William C. Thompson (New York judge) (1924–2018), New York politician and judge
 William Paul Thompson (1937–1989), American serial killer
 William L. ("T") Thompson (born 1951), pilot for Delta Air Lines, lawyer, and businessman
 William C. Thompson (Alabama judge) (born 1962), judge on the Alabama Court of Civil Appeals
 William Harvey Thompson (died 1927), prohibition enforcement agent in Seattle, Washington
 William Thompson (confidence man), American criminal
 William S. Thompson, American judge in West Virginia
 William Thompson (pirate), ship captain who stole the Treasure of Lima c. 1820
 William Thompson (1805–1866), also known as Wiremu Tamihana, Maori preacher

See also
 Bill Thompson (disambiguation)
 Billy Thompson (disambiguation)
 William Thomson (disambiguation)
 William H. Thompson (disambiguation)
 William Thompson House (disambiguation)